Antonio Joaquín Parra Fernández (born 17 June 1961) is a Spanish football manager and former player. A midfielder, he played 283 matches and scored 30 goals over 11 seasons in La Liga, mainly playing for Betis (seven years). He also spent two years with Real Madrid.

Club career
Born in Seville, Parra made his professional debut with his hometown club Real Betis at age 18,  and played there until 1986–87, appearing in a career-best La Liga 44 games – all as a starter – that season, which had a second stage. He left the Andalusians with 283 competitive matches to his credit, including four in the UEFA Cup and 19 in the Copa de la Liga; he reached the final of the latter tournament in 1986, losing it to FC Barcelona 1–2 on aggregate.

Subsequently, Parra transferred to Atlético Madrid, where, after a first year in which he played 33 games and scored five goals, he featured sparingly, which also occurred the following two seasons, now with Real Madrid (only 20 competitive appearances).

After an unsuccessful trial in Hungary with Budapest Honvéd FC, Parra signed with Écija Balompié in 1992, after which he retired. In the 2000s he took up coaching, with Betis' C and B teams as well as Coria CF, subsequently working in directorial capacities for the former club.

In October 2006, Parra joined Andalusia's coaching staff, led by José Enrique Díaz.

References

External links

Betisweb stats and bio 

1961 births
Living people
Footballers from Seville
Spanish footballers
Association football midfielders
La Liga players
Segunda División B players
Real Betis players
Atlético Madrid footballers
Real Madrid CF players
Écija Balompié players
Spain under-21 international footballers
Spain under-23 international footballers
Spanish football managers
Segunda División B managers